William Stapleton may refer to:

William Stapleton (died 1432), MP for Cumberland (UK Parliament constituency)
William Stapleton (MP for Carlisle) (c. 1495–1544), English politician
Sir William Stapleton, 1st Baronet, Irish colonial administrator and planter
Sir William Stapleton, 4th Baronet (c. 1698–1740), his son, English politician, MP for Oxfordshire
William Stapleton (British Army officer) (died 1826), British general